Community Impact Newspaper is a chain of local monthly newspapers delivered for free to homes and businesses in Texas. John P. Garrett is the CEO and founder, along with his wife Jennifer Garrett. In May 2022, Community Impact Newspaper had more than 40 print editions delivering to more than 2.7 million mailboxes in the Austin, Houston, Dallas–Fort Worth, Phoenix, and Nashville areas.

History

In September 2005, Community Impact Newspaper published by JG Media, Inc. launched its first edition in Round Rock and Pflugerville, Texas. There were six employees including the founder and publisher, John P. Garrett, and the company met in the game room in John's house. Garrett was a former Advertising Director of the Austin Business Journal before he started Community Impact Newspaper.

In its first five years, Community Impact Newspaper added about 60 employees and launched 10 community newspapers, including its first in the Houston Metro area in September 2009. In 2010, in a period of heavy layoffs at newspapers and throughout the legacy media industry, Community Impact Newspaper experienced growth, and pushed the idea that "Print Ain't Dead." After expanding into the Dallas–Fort Worth metro area in March 2011, the media company was featured by Editor & Publisher, CISION and CultureMap Austin.

In late 2012, Community Impact Newspaper announced plans to build a new $2.5 million headquarters in Pflugerville, TX, and the 16,000-square-foot building was completed in December 2013. John P. Garrett was featured in Forbes shortly after the announcement. In June 2015, Community Impact Newspaper announced it would invest in a $10 million printing facility at its headquarters to begin printing all newspaper editions starting in 2016. Eight months after the company's 10-year anniversary in September 2015, Community Impact Newspaper launched its 21st local newspaper edition. Nine editions are in the Austin metro area, 10 editions in the Houston metro area and four editions the Dallas–Fort Worth metro area. The company employs about 200 "Impacters" in five offices throughout the state.

Community Impact Newspaper has received 106 awards for writing and design from the National Newspaper Association since 2007, including 16 Better Newspaper Contest awards in 2016. Community Impact Newspaper has also been named to Inc. Magazine's top 5000 fastest-growing companies for seven consecutive years, from 2011–2016.

Additionally, Community Impact Newspaper in 2016 opened a 36,000-square-foot printing facility adjacent to its headquarters in Pflugerville. Community Impact Printing, a $10 million press operation, prints all of the newspaper editions produced by Community Impact Newspaper staff. While the company is intensely focused on its quality print product, efforts to competitively expand daily news coverage online accelerated in 2016 

In 2018, Community Impact Newspaper announced its first launch outside of Texas into Phoenix, Arizona, debuting its first area edition in Gilbert.

Markets

As of 2022 the following markets are being served with various individual editions:

 Austin metro area including Travis County, Williamson County, Hays County and Comal County
 Houston metro area including Brazoria County, Harris County, Fort Bend County, Montgomery County and Galveston County
 Dallas | Fort Worth Metroplex including Tarrant County, Collin County, Denton County and Dallas County
Phoenix metro area including Maricopa County
Nashville metro area 
San Antonio metro area

The newspaper is mailed to all households and businesses in the given area assuring widespread circulation. It is a non-subscription based newspaper and comes free in the mail each month. However, subscriptions are available for those outside of the circulation area.

References

Newspapers published in Austin, Texas
Monthly newspapers
Hyperlocal media
Local mass media in the United States
Newspaper companies of the United States